Kalaya is a town in Orakzai District, in the Khyber Pakhtunkhwa province (formerly part of the Federally Administered Tribal Areas) of Pakistan. It is located at 33°44'44"N 70°57'35"E with an altitude of 1645 meters. It is currently the winter administrative capital of Orakzai District, and is located in Lower Orakzai Tehsil. The summer administrative capital is Ghiljo Bazar.

References

Populated places in Orakzai District